The Jebba Hydroelectric Power Station, also Jebba Power Station, is a hydroelectric power plant across the Niger River in  Nigeria. It has a power generating capacity of 578.4 megawatts, enough to power over 364,000 homes. The plant was commissioned on 13 April 1985, although commercial energy production began in 1983.

Location

Overview
The power station, owned by the Federal Government of Nigeria comprises six generation turbines, each with a rated capacity of 96.4 megawatts, for a maximum installed output of 578.4 megawatts. The concession agreement for operations and maintenance at this power station is held by Mainstream Energy Solutions Limited, an independent power company. Five of the generation units are available, as of January 2021. The sixth generation unit is inoperable, since it was damaged by a fire in April 2009.

Repairs and renovation
In January 2021, Andritz AG, an Austrian engineering conglomerate, was selected by Mainstream Energy to repair the defective turbine and restore to power station to maximum capacity. The electrical-mechanical works include: (a) replacement of the 96.4 megawatts turbine (b) installation of a new 103MVA generator (c) installation of a new transformer (d) installation of a new outdoor switchyard and (e) replacement of accessory equipment, including the intake gate.

The repairs and renovations are expected to cost approximately NGN13.68 billion (US$36 million or €30million). Renovation work is expected to last until the first quarter of 2024.

References

External links
 Generating unit undergoing rehab at Jebba hydro plant, further work planned As of 11 December 2020.

Kwara State
Niger State
1985 establishments in Nigeria
Hydroelectric power stations in Nigeria
Energy infrastructure completed in 1985
20th-century architecture in Nigeria